Saint-Sylvestre is a municipality in the Municipalité régionale de comté de Lotbinière in Quebec, Canada. It is part of the Chaudière-Appalaches region and the population is 989 as of 2009. It is named after Pope Sylvester I.

The Saint-Sylvestre "Miracles"
In 1948-1949, the Bélanger family of Saint-Sylvestre found fame in performing "healing miracles." Visitors from Canada and the United States came to be cured by one of the four Bélanger children, aged 8 to 12. The children allegedly acquired healing powers after having seen their deceased sisters dressed like angels and escorted by the Holy Virgin.

Visitors would leave money to the children for their curing deeds, and they received the support of Reverend Emile Bourassa, from neighbouring Saint-Patrice-de-Beaurivage. The priest of Saint-Sylvestre, Reverend Edmond Pelletier, preached against these "miracles" and in 1949, Archbishop Maurice Roy, in the name of the Archdiocese of Quebec, ruled the affair as a hoax. The Bélanger home was closed to visitors soon after.

Royal Canadian Air Force Station St. Sylvestre
From 1953 to 1964, Saint-Sylvestre hosted a Pinetree Line Radar station located on Mont Saint-Marguerite, just five miles southeast of the Village. Construction starting in 1952, the Station opened on 15 September 1953, as RCAF Station Ste-Marie, being renamed RCAF Station St. Sylvestre, in 1955. The Station closed in 1964.

References

Commission de toponymie du Québec
Ministère des Affaires municipales, des Régions et de l'Occupation du territoire

Municipalities in Quebec
Incorporated places in Chaudière-Appalaches
Designated places in Quebec
Lotbinière Regional County Municipality